Human penises vary in size on a number of measures, including length and circumference when flaccid and erect. Besides the natural variability of human penises in general, there are factors that lead to minor variations in a particular male, such as the level of arousal, time of day, ambient temperature, anxiety level, physical activity, and frequency of sexual activity. Compared to other primates, including large examples such as the gorilla, the human penis is thickest, both in absolute terms and relative to the rest of the body. Most human penis growth occurs in two stages: the first between infancy and the age of five; and then between about one year after the onset of puberty and, at latest, approximately 17 years of age.

Measurements vary, with studies that rely on self-measurement reporting a significantly higher average than those with a health professional measuring. , a systematic review of 15,521 men, who were measured by health professionals rather than themselves, concluded that the average length of an erect human penis is 13.12 cm (5.17 inches) long, while the average circumference of an erect human penis is 11.66 cm (4.59 inches). A 1996 study of flaccid length found a mean of  when measured by staff. Flaccid penis length can sometimes be a poor predictor of erect length.
Limited to no statistically significant correlation between penis size and the size of other body parts has been found in research. Some environmental factors in addition to genetics, such as the presence of endocrine disruptors, can affect penis growth.

Studies

While results vary slightly across reputable studies, the consensus is that the mean human penis, when erect, is in the range  in length.

 

A 2015 systematic review published by Veale et al. of medical research on the topic over the previous 30 years published in BJU International showed similar results, giving mean flaccid, stretched non-erect, and erect lengths of 9.16 cm, 13.24 cm, and 13.12 cm respectively, and mean flaccid and erect circumferences of 9.31 cm and 11.66 cm respectively. Erect lengths in the included studies were measured by pushing the pre-pubic fat pad to the bone, and flaccid or erect girth (circumference) was measured at the base or mid-shaft of the penis.

Length

Flaccid
One study (published in 1996) found the mean flaccid penis length to be  (measured by staff). A review of several studies found average flaccid length to be . Length of the flaccid penis does not necessarily correspond to length of the erect penis; some smaller flaccid penises grow much longer, while some larger flaccid penises grow comparatively less.

The penis and scrotum can contract involuntarily in reaction to cold temperatures, anxious or nervous level and participation in sports. This decrease of flaccid penis size is referred to by the slang term "shrinkage", due to action by the cremaster muscle. The same phenomenon affects cyclists and exercise bike users, with prolonged pressure on the perineum from the bicycle saddle and the straining of the exercise causing the penis and scrotum to contract involuntarily. An incorrect saddle may ultimately cause erectile dysfunction (see crotch pressure for more information). Individuals with hard flaccid syndrome or other pelvic floor disorders may temporarily have an abnormally small penis.

Stretched
Neither age nor size of the flaccid penis accurately predicted erectile length. Stretched length has correlated with erect length in some cases. However, studies have also shown drastic differences between stretched and erect length. One study found that a minimal tension force of approximately 450 g during stretching of the penis was required to reach a full potential erection length. This study also found that tension forces exerted in this study by the urologist were shown to be significantly (P<0.01) lower than 450g. This may account for differences between stretched and erect length.
The 2015 study of 15,521 men found that the average length of a stretched flaccid penis was 13.24 cm (5.21 inches) long, which is near identical to the average length of an erect human penis which is 13.12 cm (5.17 inches) long.
In addition, they checked for correlations in a random subset of the sample consisting of 325 men. They found a few statistically significant Spearman's correlations: between flaccid length and height of 0.208, −0.140 with weight, and −0.238 with BMI, flaccid circumference and height 0.156, stretched length and height 0.221, weight −0.136, BMI −0.169. They also reported a few non-significant correlations.

Erect
Scientific studies have been performed on the erect length of the adult penis. Studies that have relied on self-measurement, including those from Internet surveys, consistently reported a higher average length than those that used medical or scientific methods to obtain measurements.

The following staff-measured studies are composed of different subgroups of the human population (in other words, specific age range or race; selection of those with sexual medical concerns or self-selection) that could cause a sample bias.

The purpose of the study was to "provide guidelines of penile length and circumference to assist in counseling patients considering penile augmentation." Erection was pharmacologically induced in 80 physically normal American men (varying ethnicity, average age 54). It was concluded: "Neither patient age nor size of the flaccid penis accurately predicted erectile length."
The study intended "to identify clinical and engineering parameters of the flaccid penis for prediction of penile size during erection." Erection was pharmacologically induced in 50 Jewish Caucasian patients who had been evaluated for erectile dysfunction (ED) (average age 47±14y). Patients with penis abnormalities or whose ED could be attributed to more than one psychological origin were omitted from the study.
A review published in the 2007 issue of BJU International showed the average erect penis length to be  and girth to be . The paper compared results of twelve studies conducted on different populations in several countries. Various methods of measurements were included in the review.
A 2015 study by BJU International concluded the average erect penis length to be 13.12 cm (5.16 inches).
A 2013 study of 253 men from Tanzania found that the average erect penis length of Tanzanian males was 13.12 cm (5.17 inches)
A Korean study (published in 1971) of 702 men ages 21 to 31 identified the average erect penis length to be . Another study (from 1998) of 150 Koreans found the average erect penis length to be . The most recent study (published in 2016) of 248 Korean men identified the average erect penis length to be .
A 2020 review in the Journal of Sex & Marital Therapy found that the majority of men believed that the average erect penis length is more than 15.24 cm (6 inches). This inaccurate belief has likely been fed by inaccurate and exaggerated data presented in studies where the size of the participants erect  penis is self-reported. Participants may report overestimates of the size of their penis in the belief that a larger penis is more socially desirable.  The same review analyzed the results from ten prior studies where measurements of erect penis size were made by researchers. They reported an erect penis to be between 12.95 and 13.92 cm (5.1 and 5.5 inches, respectively) in length, a result significantly below the average obtained in self-reported studies. The authors commented that results of such measurement studies may still be inflated due to volunteer bias – the possibility that men with larger penises may be more likely to choose to participate in such studies.

Erect circumference
Similar results exist regarding studies of the circumference of the adult fully erect penis, with the measurement usually taken mid-shaft. As with length, studies that relied on self-measurement consistently reported a significantly higher average than those with staff measuring. In a study of penis size where measurements were taken in a laboratory setting, the average penis circumference when erect was 11.66 cm (4.59 inches).

Size at birth
Limited growth of the penis occurs between birth and 5 years of age, but very little occurs between 5 years and the onset of puberty. W.A. Schonfeld published a penis growth curve in 1943.

Size with ageing
Authors of a paper reviewing research on area of penis sizes conclude that "flaccid penile length is just under  at birth and changes very little until puberty, when there is marked growth."

Age is not believed to negatively correlate with penis size. "Individual research studies have... suggested that penis size is smaller in studies focusing on older men, but Wylie and Eardley found no overall differences when they collated the results of various studies [over a 60 year period]."

Size and height
A 2015 review of the literature found two studies finding height and stretched or flaccid length to be moderately correlated, seven studies finding weak correlation for flaccid, stretched, or erect length, and two studies that found no correlation between flaccid length and height.

Size and hands
One study investigated the relationship with digit ratio and found that men with longer ring fingers than index fingers had slightly longer penises. However, the common misconception that hand size predicts penis size has been widely discredited.

Size and other body parts
One study, Siminoski and Bain (1988), found a weak correlation between the size of the stretched penis and foot size and height; however, it was too weak to be used as a practical estimator. Another investigation, Shah and Christopher (2002), which cited Siminoski and Bain (1988), failed to find any evidence for a link between shoe size and stretched penis size, stating "the supposed association of penile length and shoe size has no scientific basis".

A study by Ikegaya et al. (2021) concluded that nose size was highly related to stretched penile length in Japanese male cadavers.

There may be a link between the malformation of the genitalia and the human limbs. The development of the penis in an embryo is controlled by some of the same Hox genes (in particular HOXA13 and HOXD13) as those that control the development of the limbs. Mutations of some Hox genes that control the growth of limbs cause malformed genitalia (hand-foot-genital syndrome).

Size and race

Alleged differences in races have led to the creation of sexual myths.
A 2005 study reported that "there is no scientific background to support the alleged 'oversized' penis in black people".

A study of 253 men from Tanzania found that the average stretched flaccid penis length of Tanzanian males is 11.5 cm (4.53 inches) long, smaller than the worldwide average, stretched flaccid penis length of 13.24 cm (5.21 inches), and average erect penis length of 13.12 cm (5.17 inches).

A 2014 study, conducted from 2011–2013 on 5196 Chinese males, reported an average flaccid unstretched penis length of 6.55 cm (2.57 inches) long, an average flaccid stretched length of 12.9 cm (5.08 inches) long, and an average erect length of 12.9 cm (5.08 inches) long. They stated that they had "also found that penile dimensions are different in different ethnicities, but further investigations are needed to validate this”. However, the ‘different ethnicities’ referred to in the study were ethnicities within the Chinese population. 

A 2016 study of 248 Korean men identified the average erect penis length to be . 

A study of 115 men from Nigeria found that the average flaccid stretched penis length of Nigerian males is 13.37 cm (5.26 inches) long, which is near identical to the worldwide average, stretched flaccid penis length of 13.24 cm (5.21 inches) and average erect penis length of 13.12 cm (5.17 inches).

A 2014 American study by Herbenick et al. of 1,661 sexually active men involving Asian American, Black American, White American, Pacific Islander/Hawaiian, and Native American men, found average 
racial differences in erect penile length and circumference to be generally less than one centimeter, with averages in length being: 14.14 cm (5.56 inches) for Asian Americans, 14.66 cm (5.77 inches) for Black Americans, 14.88 cm (5.85 inches) for Pacific Islanders/Hawaiians, 12.86 cm (5.06 inches) for Native Americans, and 14.18 cm (5.58 inches) for White Americans (And in circumference: Asians 12.10 cm, Blacks 12.29 cm, Pacific Islanders 11.88 cm, Native Americans 11.36 cm, and Whites 12.25 cm).

A 2015 systematic review of 15,521 men found "no indications of differences in racial variability", and stated that it was not possible to draw any conclusions about size and race from the available literature and that further research needed to be conducted.

According to Aaron Spitz, a urologist, many websites and studies promoting variation of penis size between races use unscientific methods of collecting information and often ignore contradictory evidence. He concludes that "when you really take a good look at the naked data, there’s not a whole lot there [showing racial variation in penis size]."

Size preferences among sexual partners
In a 1994 cover story by Psychology Today, 1,500 readers (about two-thirds women) were surveyed about male body image. Many of the women were not particularly concerned with penis size, and over 71% thought men overemphasized the importance of penis size and shape. Generally, the women polled cared more about width than men thought, and less about length than men thought, although the strength of caring for either among women showed a similar pattern.

In a small study conducted by University of Texas–Pan American and published in 2001 in BMC Women's Health, 50 undergraduate women were surveyed by two popular male athletes on campus about their perceptions of sexual satisfaction and it was concluded that the width of a penis feels better than the length of a penis, when subjects are asked to choose between the two (size was left unspecified). It was also concluded that this may show that penis size overall affects sexual satisfaction, since women chose between the two options they were given.

A study published in 2002, conducted at Groningen University Hospital, asked 375 sexually active women (who had recently given birth) the importance of penis size. The results showed that 21% of women felt length was important and 32% felt that girth was important.

A study conducted at the Australian National University, published in early 2013, showed that penis size influences a man's sex appeal, and the taller the man, the bigger the effect. The study showed life-sized 3D computer-generated images, altering the height and other physical attributes, with women typically registering preferences in under 3 seconds. A preference for taller men's larger penis size was indicated.

A US study published in 2015 of the stated preferences of a panel of 75 women using 3D-printed models as scale references showed a preferred penis length of 16 cm (6.3 inches) and a preferred circumference of 12.2 cm for long-term sexual partners, with slightly larger preferred sizes of a length of 16.3 cm (6.4 inches) and circumference of 12.7 cm for one-time sexual encounters.

According to the study, however, when asked to estimate the length of their partner's penis, most women would say a size significantly smaller than what their partner was recorded to be. This suggests that perception of size is not entirely accurate. The visual impression of the size is not necessarily in correlation with the feeling in the vulva and vagina. A very long penis can cause dispareunia, if the man doesn't understand how to use it carefully.

Condom use
One Australian study of 184 men looked at penis length and circumference in relationship to condom breakage or slippage. 3,658 condoms were used. The study found that when used correctly, condoms had a breakage rate of 1.34% and a slippage rate of 2.05%, for a total failure rate of 3.39%. Penile dimensions did not influence slippage, although penis circumference and broken condoms were strongly correlated, with larger sizes increasing the rate of breakage.

Biochemistry
Androgens like testosterone are responsible for penis enlargement and elongation during puberty. Penis size is positively correlated with increasing testosterone levels during puberty. But after puberty, administration of testosterone does not affect penis size, and androgen deficiency in adult men only results in a small decrease in size. Growth hormone (GH) and insulin-like growth factor 1 (IGF-1) are also involved in penis size, with deficiency (such as that observed in growth hormone deficiency or Laron syndrome) at critical developmental stages having the potential to result in micropenis.

Variance

Genetics
There are certain genes, like homeobox (Hox a and d) genes, which may have a role in regulating penis size. In humans, the AR gene, located on the X chromosome at Xq11-12, may affect penis size. The SRY gene located on the Y chromosome may have a role to play. Variance in size can often be attributed to de novo mutations. Deficiency of pituitary growth hormone or gonadotropins or mild degrees of androgen insensitivity can cause small penis size in males and can be addressed with growth hormone or testosterone treatment in early childhood.

Conditions

An adult penis with an erect length of less than 7 cm or 2.76 inches but otherwise formed normally is referred to in a medical context as having the micropenis condition. The condition affects 0.6% of men. Some of the identifiable causes are deficiency of pituitary growth hormone or gonadotropins, mild degrees of androgen insensitivity, a variety of genetic syndromes and variations in certain homeobox genes. Some types of micropenis can be addressed with growth hormone or testosterone treatment in early childhood. Operations are also available to increase penis size in cases of micropenis in adults.

Environmental influence
It has been suggested that differences in penis size between individuals are caused not only by genetics, but also by environmental factors such as culture, diet and chemical or pollution exposure. Endocrine disruption resulting from chemical exposure has been linked to genital deformation in both sexes (among many other problems). Chemicals from both synthetic (e.g., pesticides, anti-bacterial triclosan, plasticizers for plastics) and natural (e.g., chemicals found in tea tree oil and lavender oil) sources have been linked to various degrees of endocrine disruption.

Both PCBs and the plasticizer DEHP have been associated with smaller penis size. DEHP metabolites measured from the urine of pregnant women have been significantly associated with the decreased penis width, shorter anogenital distance and the incomplete descent of testicles of their newborn sons, replicating effects identified in animals. According to a 2008 study published by the US National Library of Medicine, approximately 25% of US women have phthalate levels similar to those observed in animals.

A 2007 study by the University of Ankara, Faculty of Medicine, found that penile size may decrease as a result of some hormonal therapy combined with external beam radiation therapy. In addition, some estrogen-based fertility drugs like diethylstilbestrol (DES) have been linked to genital abnormalities or a smaller than normal penis (microphallus).

A 2016 Korean study found that newborn male circumcision is associated with shorter penile length.

Historical perceptions

Prehistory
Perceptions of penis size are culture-specific. Some prehistoric sculptures and petroglyphs depict male figures with exaggerated erect penises. Ancient Egyptian cultural and artistic conventions generally prevented large penises from being shown in art, as they were considered obscene, but the scruffy, balding male figures in the Turin Erotic Papyrus are shown with exaggeratedly large genitals. The Egyptian god Geb is sometimes shown with a massive erect penis and the god Min is almost always shown with an erection.

Ancient

The males of ancient Greece believed that small penises were ideal. Scholars believe that most ancient Greeks probably had roughly the same size penises as most other Europeans, but Greek artistic portrayals of handsome youths show them with inordinately small, uncircumcised penises with disproportionately large foreskins, indicating that these were seen as ideal. Large penises in Greek art are reserved exclusively for comically grotesque figures, such as satyrs, a class of hideous, horse-like woodland spirits, who are shown in Greek art with absurdly massive penises. Actors portraying male characters in ancient Greek comedy wore enormous, fake, red penises, which dangled underneath their costumes; these were intended as ridiculous and were meant to be laughed at.

In Aristophanes's comedy The Clouds, "Mr. Good Reason" gives the character Pheidippides a description of the ideal youth: "A glistening chest and glowing skin / Broad shoulders, a small tongue /A mighty bottom and a tiny prong." In Greek mythology, Priapus, the god of fertility, had an impossibly large penis that was always permanently erect. Priapus was widely seen as hideous and unattractive. A scholion on Apollonius of Rhodes's Argonautica states that, when Priapus's mother Aphrodite, the goddess of love and beauty, gave birth to him, she was so horrified by the size of his penis, his massive potbelly, and his huge tongue that she abandoned him to die in the wilderness. A herdsman found him and raised him as his son, later discovering that Priapus could use his massive penis to aid in the growth of plants.

Nonetheless, there are indications that the Greeks had an open mind about large penises. A statue of the god Hermes with an exaggerated penis stood outside the main gate of Athens and in Alexandria in 275 BC, a procession in honor of Dionysus hauled a 180-foot phallus through the city and people venerated it by singing hymns and reciting poems. The Romans, in contrast to the Greeks, seem to have admired large penises and large numbers of large phalli have been recovered from the ruins of Pompeii. Depictions of Priapus were very popular in Roman erotic art and literature. Over eighty obscene poems dedicated to him have survived.

Penis size is alluded to in the Bible:

18 And she revealed her whorings, and she revealed her nakedness, and so I turned from her just as I turned from her sister.  19 Yet she increased her whorings, recalling the days of her childhood when she was prostituted in the land of Egypt.  20 And she lusted after her male lovers whose genitalia were the genitalia of male donkeys and their seminal emission was the seminal emission of horses. Ezekiel 23:18-20 Lexham English Bible

Ancient Chinese legend holds that a man named Lao Ai had the largest penis in history and that he had an affair with Queen Dowager Zhao ( 280–228 BC), the mother of Qin Shi Huang, by pretending to be a eunuch. Ancient Koreans admired large penises and King Jijeung (437–514 AD) of the Silla Dynasty is said to have had a forty-five-centimeter penis that was so large his subordinates had to search for a woman that fit him. Traditional Japanese erotic paintings usually show genitals as exaggeratedly large. The oldest known painting of this type, found in the Hōryū-ji Temple in Ikaruga, dates to the eighth century AD and depicts a fairly large penis.

The ancient Indian sexual treatise Kama Sutra, originally written in Sanskrit, probably between the second and fourth centuries AD, divides men into three classes based on penis size: "hare" size (about 5–7 cm, or 2–3 inches, when erect), "bull" size (10–15 cm, or 4–6 inches), and "horse" size (18–20 cm, or 7–8 inches). The treatise also divides women's vaginas into three sizes ("deer", "mare", and "elephant") and advises that a man match the size of the vagina of the woman he is having sex with to the size of his own penis. It also gives medically dubious advice on how to enlarge one's penis using wasp stings.

Post-classical

In medieval Arabic literature, a longer penis was preferred, as described in an Arabian Nights tale called "Ali with the Large Member". As a witty satire of this fantasy, the 9th-century Afro-Arab author Al-Jahiz wrote: "If the length of the penis were a sign of honor, then the mule would belong to the Quraysh" (the tribe to which Muhammad belonged and from which he descended).

The medieval Norsemen considered the size of a man's penis as the measure of his manliness, and a thirteenth-century Norse magic talisman from Bergen, a wooden stave inscribed with writing in runic script, promises its wearer: "You will fuck Rannveig the Red. It will be bigger than a man's prick and smaller than a horse's prick." A late fourteenth century account of the life of Saint Óláfr from the Flateyjarbók describes a pagan ritual which centered around a preserved horse's penis used as a cult artifact which members of the cult would pass around in a circle, making up verses in praise of it, encouraging it and the other members of the group to behave in sexually suggestive ways.

During the Renaissance, some men in Europe began to wear codpieces, which accentuated their genitals. There is no direct evidence that it was necessarily worn to enhance the apparent size of the wearer's penis, but larger codpieces were seen as more fashionable.

Contemporary perceptions

Male self-perception
Males may quite easily underestimate the size of their own penis relative to those of others. A survey by sexologists showed that many men who believed that their penis was of inadequate size had average-sized penises. Another study found sex education of standard penile measurements to be helpful and relieving for patients concerned about small penis size, most of whom had incorrect beliefs of what is considered medically normal. The study found that almost all of their patients that were concerned about their penis size overestimated the average penis size. The perception of having a large penis is often linked to higher self-esteem. Fears of shrinking of the penis in folklore have led to a type of mass hysteria called penis panic, though the penis legitimately can shrink in size due to scar tissue formation in the penis from a medical condition called Peyronie's disease. Marketers of penis enlargement products exploit fears of inadequacy, but there is no consensus in the scientific community of any non-surgical technique that permanently increases either the thickness or length of the erect penis that already falls into the normal range.

Shrinking and enlarging
Widespread private concerns related to penis size have led to a number of folklore sayings and popular culture reflections related to penis size. Penis panic is a form of mass hysteria involving the believed removal or shrinking of the penis, known as genital retraction syndrome. The penis can significantly shrink due to scar tissue formation from a condition called Peyronie's disease which affects up to 10% of men. Products such as penis pumps, pills, and other dubious means of penis enlargement are some of the most marketed products in email spam. At present there is no consensus in the scientific community of any non-surgical technique that permanently increases either the thickness or length of the erect penis that already falls into the normal range (4.5" to 7").

Among male homosexuals
A study undertaken at Utrecht University found that the majority of gay men in the study regarded a large penis as ideal, and having one was linked to self-esteem. One study analysing the self-reported Kinsey data set found that the average penis of a homosexual man was larger than the average penis of their heterosexual counterparts (6.32 inches [16.05 cm] in length amongst gay men versus 5.99 in [15.21 cm] in heterosexuals, and 4.95 inches [12.57 cm] circumference amongst gay men versus 4.80 in [12.19 cm] in heterosexual men).

Evolution

The human penis is thicker than that of any other primate, both in absolute terms and relative to the rest of the body. Early research, based on inaccurate measurements, concluded that the human penis was also longer. In fact, the penis of the common chimpanzee is no shorter than in humans, averaging 14.4 cm (5.7 inches), and some other primates have comparable penis sizes relative to their body weight.

The evolutionary reasons for the increased thickness have not been established. One explanation is that thicker penises are an adaptation to a corresponding increase in vaginal size. The vaginal canal is believed to have expanded in humans to accommodate the larger size of a newborn's skull. Women may then have sexually selected men with penises large enough to fit their vagina, to provide sexual stimulation and ensure ejaculation.

Other evolutionary hypotheses to explain humans' relatively large penis length and girth include a sperm competition hypothesis and a mate competition hypothesis. The sperm competition hypothesis does not have much support as in other mammals where sperm competition is present, larger testes evolve, not larger penises. The mate competition hypothesis involves the prediction that a human with a larger penis would be able to displace the sperm of another. Studies have found that larger penises do not displace other sperm more effectively than smaller penises, but rather longer penises may ejaculate sperm inside the vagina in places that would be harder for a following penis to displace. The depth of pelvic thrusting was correlated to the displacement of competing sperm.

See also

 Human vaginal size
 Jonah Falcon
 Penis enlargement
 Penis envy
 Phalloplasty
 Sexual selection in humans
 The Third Chimpanzee
 Why Is Sex Fun?

References

Citations

General and cited sources

External links

Andrology
Human size
Human penis